Poecilimon ornatus is a species belonging to the family Tettigoniidae  subfamily Phaneropterinae. It is endemic to Austria, Italy, Albania, the Balkans, Bulgaria, and Greece. It lives in grasslands and shrubland.

References

Orthoptera of Europe
Insects described in 1850
Phaneropterinae